The Aerotécnica AC-14 was a Spanish five-seat light helicopter of the 1950s, designed by Jean Cantinieau, based on enlarging his Nord Norelfe design.

The AC-14 continued the Cantinieau practice of mounting the engine forward of the main rotor, and like the Norelfe, used the ducted exhaust from the turboshaft to counter the torque of the main rotor at low speeds, while at high speeds the exhaust gases were deflected rearwards to increase speed, torque being compensated for by movable twin tail fins.

The first of prototype flew on 16 July 1957. A pre-production order for ten machines was placed by the Spanish Air Force where they served for a short time under the designation EC-XZ-4. No full production ensued, as they were much more expensive than second-hand Bell 47G-2 and G-3s.

Operators 
 
 Spanish Air Force - Ten pre-production aircraft only.

Specifications

See also

References

Further reading

 
 

1950s Spanish helicopters
1950s Spanish military utility aircraft
AC-14
Single-turbine helicopters